is a Japanese professional baseball pitcher who is currently a free agent. He has played in Nippon Professional Baseball (NPB) for the Tokyo Yakult Swallows and Yokohama DeNA BayStars.

Career

Tokyo Yakult Swallows
Tokyo Yakult Swallows selected Kazahari with the third selection in the 2014 NPB draft.

On May 3, 2015, Kazahari made his NPB debut.

On December 2, 2020, he became a free agent.

Yokohama DeNA BayStars
On December 10, 2020, Kazahari signed with Yokohama DeNA BayStars of NPB.

Wild Health Genomes
On February 23, 2022, Kazahari signed with the Wild Health Genomes of the Atlantic League of Professional Baseball. Kazahari pitched in 4 games for the Genomes, struggling to a 9.64 ERA with 5 strikeouts in 4.2 innings pitched. He was released by the team on August 1.

References

External links

 NPB.com

1993 births
Living people
Baseball people from Iwate Prefecture
Japanese baseball players
Nippon Professional Baseball pitchers
Tokyo Yakult Swallows players
Yokohama DeNA BayStars players